The Insurgency in the Preševo Valley was an approximately two year-long armed conflict between the Federal Republic of Yugoslavia and the ethnic Albanian separatists of the Liberation Army of Preševo, Medveđa and Bujanovac (UÇPMB). There were instances during the conflict in which the Yugoslav government requested KFOR support in suppressing UÇPMB attacks since they could only use lightly armed military forces as part of the Kumanovo Treaty that ended the Kosovo War, which created a buffer zone between FR Yugoslavia and Kosovo.

Background
Before the insurgency Preševo Valley was home to approximately 100,000 people, of whom 70,000 were Albanians and another 30,000 Serbs. Albanians make up to 95% of Preševo, 55% of Bujanovac and 26% of Medveđa population. The region is sometimes referred to as Eastern Kosovo by Albanians.
The Albanian-populated region became a part of Serbia in 1913, after the First Balkan War.

From 1945 to 1946 Preševo and Bujanovac were a part of newly established Autonomous Oblast of Kosovo and Metohija inside the Federated State of Serbia. In 1946 they were transferred to Central Serbia in exchange for a part of Serb inhabited modern-day North Kosovo. During the breakup of Yugoslavia, on 1 and 2 March 1992 Albanians from Preševo Valley held the referendum about their future status in Serbia. The majority, 97% of voters demanded autonomy for the valley and the right to join Republic of Kosova. Serbian government rejected the referendum as unconstitutional and illegal.

The Kosovo War was a parallel conflict between the Yugoslav Army and the Kosovo Liberation Army. It began in February 1998 and ended on 10 June 1999 when the Kumanovo Agreement was signed. According to the agreement, KFOR troops, supervised by the United Nations, would enter as a peacekeeping force, while Yugoslav military forces were to withdraw. It was agreed that the KLA would disband by 19 September 1999. According to the agreement there would be a demilitarized zone around Kosovo. Serbs could only use police squads with up to 10 members. This buffer zone was used by Albanian guerrillas for attacks against Serbian forces. The Preševo valley conflict erupted in June 1999.

Ground Safety Zone 
After the Kumanovo Agreement was signed, a 5 km (3 mi) deep demilitarized zone was established along the Kosovo border. The zone's length was 382 km. The purpose of this buffer was to prevent incidents between KFOR troops and the Yugoslav army. At the same time, an Air Safety Zone was set up. Its width was 20 km. Only lightly armed police in groups of up to ten were allowed to patrol, making it difficult to ensure order. It was prohibited for Yugoslavia to use planes, tanks or any other heavier weapons, so the area became a haven for drug smuggling and operations against Yugoslav forces. The Zone consisted of the following sectors:

 Sector C west – from Plav to the Albanian border
 Sector A – from Rožaje to Medveđa
 Sector D – parts of Medveđa, Leskovac, Lebane and Vranje municipalities
 Sector B – from Medveđa to Preševo
 Sector C east – border with Macedonia to village of Norča

UÇPMB 
Liberation Army of Preševo, Medveđa and Bujanovac (UÇPMB) members were first seen during the funeral of brothers Shaqipi who were killed by the police in January 2000 in Dobrosin. They had around 1,600 active fighters and around 5,000 non-active. The Yugoslav government considered it a terrorist organization. The organization consisted of three zones. First was South zone commanded by Shaqir Shaqiri. After he was arrested in 2001, he was replaced by Mustafa Shaqiri. They had between 300 and 500 fighters. Center zone was commanded by Ridvan Qazimi, known as "Captain Lleshi", who had around 600 rebels. Lleshi was later killed in clashes near Oraovica. This zone was around Gjilan-Bujanovac regional road. In the north there was so-called Čar group, or North zone led by Muhamet Xhemajli. The highest commander was Shefket Musliu, an auto mechanic from Končulj. Rebels mostly had mine throwers and other light weapons. Those weapons were transported illegally from Kosovo throughout border with Serbia. The biggest Albanian village in Serbia, Veliki Trnovac, was the rebel center. According to Serbian Security Intelligence Agency it was full of bunkers, as well as laboratories and storehouses for heroin. PMBLA was operating in following villages:

 North zone – Muhovac (command), Ravno Bučje, Pribovce, Zarbince, Suharno, Đorđevac, Čar
 Center zone – Veliki Trnovac (command), Breznica, Mali Trnovac, Dobrosin, Končulj, Lučane and Turija
 South zone – Bukovac, Gospođince, Mađare, Ilince, Depce, Masurica, Cerevajka, Sefer, Kurbalija, Šušaja, Karadak

Rebels were controlling all villages in GSZ sector B and C east except Cerevajka and Gramada.

History

1999 
After Kosovo Liberation Army disbanded according to the peace agreement that ended Kosovo War, its veterans and members founded Liberation Army of Preševo, Medveđa and Bujanovac in a village of Dobrosin. Their goal was the secession of three Albanian populated municipalities from Serbia and their annexation to Kosovo. Fighting between police and separatist began in June 1999 in the municipality of Kuršumlija, and later spread to Medveđa, Bujanovac and Preševo. The UÇPMB established many bases in mountains and plains around towns of Bujanovac and Preševo. Main center of militants was a village of Veliki Trnovac. Because of restricted movement in that area, police and army were unable to stop them. On 21 November two policeman were killed by land mine. Serbs responded on attacks with more checkpoints and patrols. During 1999 rebels did not enter an open conflict with the police. Instead, they battled them with the mortars from the distance, so Serbs were unable to respond.

2000 
Conflict escalated in 2000. On 16 January three Serbs civilians from village Pasjane were killed by rebels in a Ground Safety Zone on a road Gjilan – Preševo. After the overthrow of Slobodan Milošević, the new government requested that NATO and KFOR suspend the demilitarized zone around Kosovo, in fear that a new war could erupt. Vojislav Koštunica wanted the US to reduce or disband the zone. During November 2000, some Serb police retreated from the demilitarized zone after four policemen were kidnapped and killed and another two wounded. That gave a chance to Albanians to take all villages the Serbs had left. After this events, Božo Prelević, one of Serbia's three interior ministers, said Serbian police would return to the zone "with all available means" unless the attacks end. On 24 November a KFOR-mediated ceasefire was agreed to.

2001 
On 5 February the fiercest fighting in the Preševo valley happened since the end of the 1999 Kosovo conflict. The Yugoslav army exchanged artillery fire for several hours across the internationally imposed buffer zone next to the border with Kosovo. On 16 February near the border town of Podujevo seven Serb civilians were killed after Niš-Ekspres bus with refugees from Kosovo was blown up by PMBLA. After that, on 7 March 2001, KFOR agreed to allow Serb military to reoccupy buffer zone (called "Ground Safety Zone") section by section. In one village where the PMBLA still stood, a guerrilla fighter died in an accidental explosion. At the same time Albanian guerrillas started mutiny in Republic of Macedonia. During the March one-week ceasefire was agreed again, after four policeman were killed. Army first entered the section on a border with Republic of Macedonia (section C East), in order to stop illegal arms smuggling. Afterwards KFOR allowed Serbs to return to zones C West and A on 25 March, and zone D on 14 April. On 21 May Albanian commanders signed Končulj agreement and agreed to disarm, but many continued to fight. Last section was around Preševo (sector B). On 24 May, the Serbian army entered the town, although Albanian fighters were attacking them. There, one of the rebel commanders, Ridvan Qazimi "Lleshi" was killed. It is not clear whether he was killed by police or by other insurgents. After the Serb victory, the UÇPMB agreed to disarm. During the 2001 insurgency in Macedonia, the PMBLA continuously funded and supported the NLA. They did that until there disarmament on 21 May 2001. Some of its veterans joined newly formed National Liberation Army in Republic of Macedonia. Around 400 guerrillas surrendered in order to get the pardon from the Yugoslav government. PMBLA chief Shefket Musliu surrendered to KFOR on 26 May. Until August 2001 there were around 1,160 attacks on Serb police and civilians.

Clashes around Bujanovac 
In July 2000 PMBLA launched an offensive in order to take the town of Bujanovac. The battle was conducted in the areas of Končulj, Dobrosin, Lučane and Devojačka Čuka as well as in the wider area around Mali Trnovac, Muhovac and Đorđevac. The PMBLA clashes with the Serbian security forces began in July 2000 and were aimed at conquering the communication Bujanovac-Gjilan and taking over the villages of the municipality of Bujanovac. The fighting was intensified in November 2000, when the police, under the influence of a threefold strength of the PMBLA, withdrew from the security checkpoints that were fought, occupying defensive positions closer to Bujanovac. The fighting broke into a pat-position at the end of November 2000 after the arrival of the JSO as well as military and police reinforcements to the south of Serbia. The conflicts were of low intensity, and were mainly reduced to occasional rebel attacks where the police only responded when the lives of its members were endangered. The offensive PMBLA in the battle near Bujanovac started on 21 November 2000, after two days of provocations and strong attacks on the positions of the police. That day, about 500 guerrillas, who were incomparably better armed than the police, were unhindered from Kosovo to the municipality of Bujanovac, and in addition to the presence of strong forces of the American KFOR contingent with the administrative line of Serbia and Kosovo.

In the period from 12.25 to 17.00 hours on 21 November, Albanians committed synchronized attacks on the Dobrosin security checkpoint, and on the positions of the police on the corners of Devojačka Čuka and Osoje.

At 12.25, 12.55 and 15.30, attacks on the Dobrosin puncture were made from mortars, automatic and sniper weapons and machine guns, when Gropi's observatory was hit on two occasions with more than 5 mines.

At 12.48 pm, an attack from mortars, infantry weapons, machine guns and brownies was carried out to local police positions at the Devojačka Čuka Corner, and at 13.30 hours the terrorists were also operating at the corner of Osoje with a fire from a mortar.

Due to strong actions, members of the Special Police Units from Gornji Milanovac were forced to withdraw from the communication Konculj – Lucane – Bujanovac, along the width of the road. Police withdrawal was hampered and slowed due to lack of knowledge of the terrain. During the withdrawal, a fierce infantry attack by Albanian rebels from the wider region of Tuštica and Visoko was followed when the observation post on the Gropi hill was occupied. In this attack, rebels captured three members of the MUP. They were taken to their camp in the territory of Kosovo where they were tormented by the religious leaders and eventually liquidated.

Around 17.00 hours the withdrawal of the people from the crisis zones was terminated because it was found that at the Dobrosin point there was a mortar of 60 millimeter, a sniper and automatic rifle, two combat ammunition kits, 6 inductor phones and more. Rebels then carry out another attack on the police patrol in Dobrosin. After this attack, police officers were withdrawn from the Municipality of Bujanovac in order to prevent further conflicts and reorganize police units. Thus, the rebels occupied the area around Dobrosin, Lucana, Konculja, Mali Trnovac and Breznica, as well as 4 police stations.

After the end of these conflicts, at night 21–22. In November, besides members of the American contingent of KFOR, about 1,000 rebels had been armed to their teeth, and entered the wider Bujanovac area. Among them were Albanians from Western European countries, from Albania and Kosovo. They immediately carried out the forced mobilization of Albanian military capable men over the age of 18. They took private vehicles and sent it all to the first combat ranks.

After establishing themselves, the following day they continued with armed attacks. In the period from 11.15 to 12.05 and from 12.30 to 15.30 on 22 November, from the direction of the villages of Dobrosin and Končulj, Albanian rebels carried out attacks from automatic weapons and mortars to the police in the village of Lučane. Later, in the period between 21:45 and 23:15 hours, the rebels carried out attacks on the police in the village of Djordjevac from mortars, hand grenades (fired 20–30 mines) and infantry weapons. The next day, on 23 November, around 10:00 am, Albanian rebels carried out an attack with 5 mines from mortars and brownies to the police patrol in the village of Djordjevac.

In response to these conflicts, the FRY demanded an urgent session of the UN Security Council to condemn the attacks. FRY President Vojislav Koštunica wrote to NATO Secretary General George Robertson with the expectation that KFOR will no longer allow incursions to southern Serbia and similar incidents. At its headquarters in Brussels, NATO emphasized that it opposed the PMBLA's downfall, while KFOR on the other announced that it would not tolerate the possible effects of the VJ in the Ground Safety Zone.

KFOR kept all the roads leading to Dobrosin, the village where the rebels were concentrated, were blocked. During this blockade, on one track, a truck driver was arrested who tried to smuggle weapons and ammunition for terrorists through the US checkpoint. In the fireplace were mortars, anti-personnel mines, machine guns and 5,000 bullets. Searching terrain KFOR found a 62 mm mortar, 16 mortar shells, one hand grenade, one automatic rifle with 2200 bullets and 25 bullets for a pistol. This hidden weapon belonged to rebels who carried out attacks from the territory of Kosovo without crossing the administrative line. There were also 10 unarmed rebels in black uniforms who tried to illegally enter the south of Serbia.

Čović's Plan 
In February 2001, Deputy Prime Minister of Serbia and Head of Coordination Center for Southern Serbia Nebojša Čović proposed the plan for resolving the crisis in Preševo Valley. The plan calls for joint police forces of local ethnic Albanians and Serbs, in proportion to the ethnic groups' populations in the area. The proposal calls for integrating the valley's ethnic Albanian population into mainstream Serbian political and social life. It also offers civil rights guarantees and promises of economic development. The plan doesn't provide autonomy for the region or possible annexation to Kosovo. Instead, it is providing decentralization to local authorities. The plan also calls for demilitarization of the Preševo Valley and disbandment of PMBLA. All rebel controlled areas should be returned to Serbia. Every rebel that surrenders will be promised a pardon from the Yugoslav government. The plan was accepted, and Albanians signed the demilitarization agreement in a village of Končulj.

Operation Return

Return of the Yugoslav Army to Sector C – East 
At 6.30 am on 14 March 2001, the return of the United Security Forces to the GSZ, Sector C (East Charlie), from the outer line of this zone, started. The Yugoslav forces were deployed west, from the Preševo-Miratovac line, in three directions: towards the villages of Miratovac, Norča and Trnava. Lieutenant-General Lieutenant-General Ninoslav Krstić was led by Lieutenant-General Lieutenant-Colonel Ninoslav Krstic. The Chief of the General Staff of the VJ, Lieutenant-General Nebojsa Pavković, Commander of the Third Army, Lieutenant General Vladimir Lazarević, Commander of the Priština Corps Major General Radojko Stefanović, General Obrad Stevanović and several other Yugoslav Army officers. The return operation was followed by the President of the FRY Coordination Body for South Serbia Nebojša Čović and members of the Coordination Body Mica Markovic and Milovan Čogurić. Entering sector C, on the triple border of Serbia, Macedonia and Kosovo, it was free of incidents. Already at 07.20, Nebojša Pavković told FRY President Vojislav Koštunica that the operation is taking place successfully. There were no land mines on the ground, nor did they see armed groups of Albanian terrorists. In the sky above Macedonia, several Cobra KFOR helicopters were observed that supervised the operation. In Sector C – East, the first units that entered were engineering units that were tasked with examining the whole field and eliminating the danger of the set mines. Soon, simultaneously with them, other members of the Army entered the zone led by General Pavković and other commanders. When Pavković entered the part of the C sector, Lieutenant Colonel David Olvein, a military attaché of the US Embassy, was watching events with extreme care, but at the same time he was very surprised when he received information that the planned time of 10 hours, ended up taking positions in just 2 hours.

Return of the Yugoslav Army C – west and sector A 
After entering the eastern part of sector C, on 22 March 2001, the KFOR command led by General Kabigoszu, in a meeting with Yugoslav representatives in Merdare, approved the entry of the Yugoslav Army into the western part of Sector C (along the border of Montenegro and Kosovo) and sector A (to the border line with the municipality of Medveđa). The return to these parts of the GSZ, carried out by the Second Army of the YA, started at 07:00 on 25 March. According to Colonel Radosav Mihailović, the on-site operation, the operation was carried out without incidents and according to the foreseen plan, followed by members of the Coordination Body, KFOR representatives as well as EU observers. This operation restored the state sovereignty of the FRY over the border belt of municipalities: Plav, Berane, Rožaje, Tutin, Novi Pazar, Raška, Brus and Kuršumlija. The total length of the western part of Sector C and Sector A was 263 km, and the width was 5 km, that is, in total, about 1300 km2.

Return of the Yugoslav Army to Sector D 
The preparations of the Yugoslav Army to enter Sector D of the Ground Security Zone (the border region of Medveđa municipality) began after the meeting of General Ninoslav Krstić with the representative of KFOR in Merdare near Kuršumlija on 2 April 2001. The agreement on entry into sector D was signed in Merdare on 12 April by Ninoslav Krstić and Nebojša Čović, as well as representatives of KFOR. Earlier, Albanian rebels attacked police positions in the village of Marovac, the municipality of Medveđa, with two mortar shells, and attacked members of the local police in Beli Kamen, municipality of Medveđa. It was precisely in these regions that there were representatives of the Coordination Body who were preparing for the occupation of the sector D. After the preparations, Yugoslav forces from the outer circumference of sector D made a move from the starting positions and entry into sector D early in the morning of 14 April. The operation was monitored by KFOR teams, EU observers and numerous journalists. After a successful operation during which there was no conflict, General Ninoslav Krstić praised the members of Operation Group South and especially praised the members of the battle group of police who occupied the Ravna Banja region – Moravce sector D. The situation in this sector after the entry of the Yugoslav Army was a staple and there were no provocations by Albanian rebels.

Return of the Yugoslav Army to Sector B 
PMBLA Commander Sefket Musliu, Ridvan Qazmi-Lleshi and Mustafa Shaqiri, signed a demobilization and demilitarization agreement of the PMBLA on 21 May in Končulj, guaranteeing the safe and peaceful entry of the Yugoslav Army into Sector B of the Ground Safety Zone according to the following schedule: Zone B South until 22 May, Zone B Center until 31 May, while Zone B North was not under the control of rebels. The agreement was signed in the presence of Sean Sullivan, head of the NATO office for Yugoslavia. On the same day, the commander of the United Security Forces, General Ninoslav Krstić, met with the KFOR Commander in Merdare and on that occasion a document on the return of the VJ to Sector B. was signed. To accomplish this task, new special anti-terrorist and anti-trust units of the United Security Forces have been engaged. The action was carried out with the coordination of KFOR and by 24 May, the Army had occupied 90 percent of the B-South and B North zones without encountering any resistance from rebels. The operation was continued to remove mines and seize weapons, ammunition and military equipment. During the occupation of the northern zone of sector B on 24 May, during the exchange of fire between the VJ and the PMBLA, the rebel commander Ridvan Qazimi, in the area of the Guri Gat Hill (Black Stone) near Veliki Trnovac, was killed. The conflict lasted from 11.30 to 15.00. Qazimi was in custody with three other extremists, and when he got up and went to his jeep, he was hit in the head. It was later revealed that he had been killed by a sniper. After the death of Qazimi, various stories began to circulate in the south of Serbia, from killing the infected PMBLA faction members about the distribution of the remaining plunder, to escaping to Kosovo and then to Albania. At the press conference, Nebojša Čović denounced the information that Qazimi was with Sean Sullivan at the time, and he removed doubts about the fate of Ridvan Qazimi, saying he was killed in a confrontation with Serbian security forces. He also praised the way B South and B North were occupied, adding that the Army will not enter Zone B Center, where the highest concentration of terrorists is located, until 31 May. The Yugoslav Army performed the last operation during the GSZ's occupation on 31 May, entering the B Center zone. The return of members of the Yugoslav Army to the central part of the sector has been restored sovereignty over this part of the territory of the FRY, and the entire action was completed by 12.00, when the Serbian security forces entered the administrative line with Kosovo. During the operation, there were no conflicts or provocations by terrorists or Albanian civilians. After entering the village of Dobrosin, the center of the terrorists, police carried out an inspection of 14 abandoned accommodation facilities. In the presence of the President of the Local Community Dobrosin, Reshat Salihi, they found 2 anti-personnel mines, uniforms and military equipment, three radio stations, 100 medical items and others. During the deployment of the Yugoslav Army along the left border of the central part of Sector B, at the Visoko Bilo, sergeant Bratislav Milinković (1957), a member of the 63rd Parachute Brigade from Niš, aimed at a counter-attack mine and received a severe injury to his left leg. He was taken to the military hospital in Bujanovac and then transferred to further treatment in Niš. With the entry of the United Security Forces in the Zone B Center, Operation Return was completed and control over the entire Ground Safety Zone was restored, ending the conflicts in southern Serbia.

Battle of Oraovica 

The Battle of Oraovica was a conflict between Army and Police of FR Yugoslavia and Albanian militant group before Serbs entered last sector of Ground Security Zone. Since the village was outside GSZ, Yugoslav forces were allowed to use heavier weapons, such as M-84 tank. On 14 May Yugoslav forces launched an attack on UÇPMB stronghold in this Albanian-populated place near the border with Kosovo.

Fighting began on 14 May at 06.10 AM by an attack on Yugoslav forces. At 07.00 AM guerrillas attacked Serbian police and army again and fired three rocket towards the village. More incidents happened during the day until 08.00 PM. On 15 May Serbian forces captured Oraovica although UÇPMB attacked them at 02.15 PM.

Deabtes were high on how many casualties there were. Yugoslav troops sustained no casualties. While the UCPMB had 2 casualties. Yugoslavia claims that 14-20 were killed, 8 wounded and that 80 were captured.

Končulj Agreement 

The Demilitarization Statement, or the Končulj Agreement, was a ceasefire signed between the FR Yugoslavia and the UÇPMB on May 20, 2001. The Končulj Agreement was the first agreement related to this part of Serbia (Preševo, Medveđa, and Bujanovac). The agreement ended the conflicts that spilled over from Kosovo, with political representatives from the local Albanians, Serbia and Kosovo committing to demilitarization.

It sought for the full demilitarization, demobilization and disarmament of the Liberation Army of Preševo, Medveđa and Bujanovac (UCPMB). It also calls for integration of ethnic Albanians into governmental, civic, economic and police structures, and support from the international community to implement the so-called Covic Plan. The agreement was signed by Serbian president Vojislav Koštunica and Shefket Musliu, the highest UÇPMB commander who surrendered.

According to the agreement, Yugoslav troops were allowed safe access to Sector B of Preševo. NATO representative Sean Sullivan witnessed the agreement as a broker of the talks in absence of direct communication between the UCPMB and the FRY government. "It's time to use other means than weapons," says Shefket Musliu, the highest commander of one of fractions of the PMBLA (UÇPMB), as he signed the Končulj agreement to lay down his arms.

Aftermath 
About 400 Albanians surrendered to KFOR and another 150 to Serbian police. They were not charged for war crimes according to the Čović plan and Končulj agreement. Most of PMBLA members joined NLA's war in Macedonia, while others joined newly formed Liberation Army of Eastern Kosovo. Because of lack of members LAEK isn't active. Several attacks on the Serb forces and civilians were recorded after the end of the war.

After reoccupation of Ground Safety Zone, Serbia separated it into 3 sectors. The sector B is stretching from Medveđa to the border with Republic of Macedonia. It is controlled by 4th Land Force Brigade situated in the city of Vranje. There are about eleven bases in this area. In 2009 largest military base in Serbia, Cepotina, was opened 5 km from Bujanovac.

In 2002 in Preševo, Medveđa and Bujanovac had 57,595 ethnic Albanians. However, they boycotted the 2011 census, so only 6,000 people were recorded. It is estimated that Preševo Valley today has around 50,000 Albanians.

Casualties and displacement 
During the conflict, 18 members of the Yugoslav security forces were killed and 68 were wounded. Eight civilians were also killed. Some of the deaths were caused by mines.

In 2013, UÇPMB veterans erected a memorial with the names of 27 insurgents who were killed in the conflict. A further 400 were reported to have surrendered to KFOR. Seven ethnic Albanian civilians were also killed.

Two United Nations observers were wounded, according to reports.

2002–2004 violence 

Low-intensity clashes continued over the next years. Chronology of most important events:

2002 

 20 May – bomb thrown on a house of ethnic Albanian in Preševo. Police said it is the fifteenth registered attack since March.
 December – police patrol was attacked in Končulj

2003 

 26 and 28 January – police patrol attacked again in Končulj
 4 February – bomb thrown on a Serb house in Levosoje
23 February – one Gendarmery member killed, two wounded in Muhovac by anti-tank mine
 2 March – anti-tank mine found in Turija
 10–11 August – attacks on a police with a mortar in Dobrosin
 12 August – road Kuršumlija – Podujevo, police attacked
 13 August – mine placed in Lučane
 23 August – grenade thrown
 27 August – police attacked in Dobrosin
 12 September- police attacked in Depce, Rudnik, Madjare and Preševo
 23 September – bomb found in a school in Bujanovac
 24 September – police attacked in Dobrosin

2004 

 4 February – Security Intelligence Agency member Selver Fazlliju killed in Bujanovac
 March – bomb found in school in Preševo

Several attacks on army were recorded in this period, such as: attack on watchtower in Čarska kula, sabotage on the pillar through which is powered the base of near Dobrosin and the stoning of a military motor vehicle in the village of Lučane.

2009 attacks 
On 9 July 2009, two members of Serbian Gendarmery were wounded after unnamed 'terrorists' attacked their Land Rover near the village of Lučane. On 14 July bomb exploded near the entrance of a building in Preševo where ethnic Albanian member of Gendarmery lived with his family. His wife and son were injured. Minister of Internal Affairs Ivica Dačić described this attacks as a terrorist act. Same night police conducted an operation on a border with Kosovo, cutting illegal arms smuggling to central Serbia. Minister Dačić also said they found large amounts of weapons and ammunition in village Norča near Preševo. The Government of Serbia accused former Liberation Army of Preševo, Medveđa and Bujanovac high-ranking member Lirim Jakupi, known as "Commander Nazi". He was also wanted by Macedonia for attacks on police in 2005.

2012–2013 monument crisis 

In November 2012, a monument dedicated to the 27 killed PMBLA fighters, was erected in Preševo's main square. The Government of Serbia was against it, therefore, they enforced an ultimatum to the local government to remove it. On 16 May the deadline expired. On 20 May, the Serbian Gendarmery surrounded the city with 200 men, backed up by heavily armored vehicles and bulldozers, started removing the monument with a bagger at 7:00 AM. At least 2,000 ethnic Albanians protested in the southern Serbian town of Preševo to protest against the removal of a memorial to fallen Albanian guerrillas. The operation was led by general Bratislav Dikić. This crisis raised the tension in the Preševo Valley once again.

2014 attack on the Gendarmery 
On 25 January 2014 a Norwegian citizen suspected to be a Wahhabi member attacked Gendarmery in Preševo. He was killed in a crossfire with the police. His motive was unknown.

Illegal logging 
During the last years, numerous incidents of illegal logging have been registered in Ground Safety Zone, reportedly involving armed groups from the territory of Kosovo. One of the incidents occurred during August 2021 when a patrol of the Serbian Army in the area called Ugljarski krš spotted a group of 12 people illegally cutting down the forest. Upon the arrival of the military patrol, the forest thieves fired a bullet into the air. The patrol reacted–it fired a warning shot and headed towards the group

The forest thieves then ran away in the direction of the Kosovo side of the administrative line, but two more bursts were heard in the immediate vicinity. There were no injuries in the incident, but, as announced by the Ministry of Defence, the Serbian Army was put on high alert in that area.

Attacks by forest thieves on army and police patrols in the administrative zone of the Kuršumlija municipality especially intensify at the end of summer and the beginning of autumn, when Albanians from Kosovo illegally cut down the forest in this area. To steal the forest, as the residents of the sparsely populated Kuršumlija villages in this area point out, forest thieves usually come armed.

During 2021 alone, 56 occurrences of illegal logging have been recorded by Serbian authorities.

Reactions 
  – Prime Minister of Albania Ilir Meta said that the problem in the Preševo Valley should be solved through "dialogue and democratic means" and not violence. The dialogue should begin soon so that the Albanians are assured internationally recognized standards of human rights. Albanian political leaders have called for expansion of the NATO buffer zone and an internationally supervised demilitarization of the valley, essentially extending Kosovo's protected status to southern Serbia. The Albanian government has condemned the violence and appealed to Kosovo's Albanian political leaders to distance themselves.
  Albanian politicians in Serbia – Jonuz Musliu, head of Political Council for Preševo said that they are against armed confrontation with Serbian government.
  – The Yugoslav president, Vojislav Koštunica, warned that fresh fighting would erupt if KFOR units did not act to prevent the attacks coming from the UÇPMB.
  Kosovo Liberation Army – Hashim Thaçi has accused Belgrade of genocide against the ethnic Albanian majority in three Serbian towns.
  ICTY – Chief Prosecutor Carla Del Ponte announced the investigation on activities of PMBLA in Preševo Valley.
  – NATO allowed Serb forces to enter Ground Safety Zone. NATO spokesman Jamie Shea said the alliance had spoken to leaders of the ethnic Albanian community in Kosovo about the situation, and warned them it would not tolerate any action that made it worse. Secretary General of NATO George Robertson denounced ethnic Albanian insurgents operating in the five-kilometer wide "ground safety zone" along southern Serbia's boundary with Kosovo. Robertson describes the insurgent Liberation Army of Presevo, Medvedja and Bujanovac as "a handful of extremists who are trying to seek an over-action." But he says they won't get far.
  – Russian Foreign Minister, Igor Ivanov, described the situation in the area as very critical; he said urgent steps were needed to stop the violence from spreading.
  – UN secretary general Kofi Annan said: "It is clear that it is the Albanians who are now the cause of these provocations". United Nations Security Council condemned Albanian extremists violence in Southern Serbia. The Security Council called ethnic Albanian extremists from Kosovo to withdraw immediately from the boundary zone.
  – USA was against secession of Preševo Valley. US officials also warned the rebels there will be no repeat of NATO intervention in Kosovo. Secretary of State Madeleine Albright said that It is very important that extremists from both sides not be allowed to disrupt the situation further.

See also 
2000 unrest in Kosovo
2001 insurgency in the Republic of Macedonia
2004 unrest in Kosovo
Kosovo independence precedent
Battle of Oraovica
List of conflicts involving Albanian rebel groups in the post-Cold War era

References

External links

1999 in Albania
1999 in Serbia
1999 in Yugoslavia
Albanian nationalism in Serbia
Conflicts in 1999
Conflicts in 2000
Conflicts in 2001
Preševo Valley
Serbia and Montenegro
Wars involving Serbia
Wars involving Yugoslavia
Yugoslav Wars
2000 in Yugoslavia
2001 in Yugoslavia